Nemenjiche may refer to:

 Nemenjiche Lake, in Eeyou Istchee Baie-James, Quebec, Canada
 Nemenjiche River, a tributary of Obatogamau Lakes in Québec, Canada